KXO (1230 kHz) is a commercial AM radio station licensed to El Centro, California.  It is owned by KXO, Inc.  Its studios and offices are on Main Street in El Centro, along with sister station KXO-FM 107.5. KXO operates with 830 watts daytime and 1,000 watts at night, as a Class C station, so its signal is limited to the Imperial Valley.  The transmitter site is off West Villa Avenue.

Programming

KXO currently broadcasts oldies music with a playlist from the 1960s and 1970s, along with some 1980s titles. It also carries the games of several Southern California sports teams:  San Diego Padres baseball, Los Angeles Chargers football and Los Angeles Lakers basketball.  CBS News Radio is heard at the beginning of most hours.

History
KXO is the oldest station in the Imperial Valley, and is probably the oldest in any community between San Diego and Phoenix. It was first licensed, as KGEN, on January 7, 1927 to E. R. Irey and F. M. Bowles. The original call letters were randomly assigned from an alphabetic roster of available call signs.

On November 11, 1928, with the implementation of the Federal Radio Commission's General Order 40, the station was assigned to 1200 kilohertz with a power of 100 watts, and at the same time changed call letters to KXO. (In Southern California, the only three-letter stations that remain, apart from KXO, are 640 KFI, 930 KHJ and 1070 KNX in Los Angeles and 760 KGB in San Diego. KGB-FM is the FM sister station to the original KGB, now KLSD 1360 AM.)

In 1930 KXO moved to 1500 kHz. In the 1930s the studios were at 793 Main Street. After the North American Regional Broadcasting Agreement (NARBA) took effect in 1941, KXO moved to 1490 kHz.  It was owned by Valradio, Inc. and was a network affiliate of the Mutual Broadcasting System and the Don Lee Network, during the "Golden Age of Radio."  Over the years, it spent time as an affiliate of ABC and NBC Radio.  In 1944, KXO moved to AM 1230. 

In 1963, the governments of the U.S. and Mexico agreed to give El Centro two TV stations, Channel 7 and Channel 9, whose signals would include parts of Mexico.   KXO, Inc. received permission from the Federal Communications Commission to build a TV station, Channel 7 KXO-TV.  But a TV station in Yuma, Arizona, KIVA Channel 11, worked to block the competing stations, saying there was not enough economic activity in the region to support three commercial TV stations.  Channel 9 KECY-TV eventually made it on the air in December 1968, but KXO-TV never did.  Channel 7 finally came on the air in 1996, under the ownership of Entravision Communications.  It is now KVYE.

Over the years, KXO featured several different programming formats. The station has had news and weather sharing partnerships with television stations KECY and KSWT.  Some on-air personalities and newscasters have also been heard on KXO and the TV stations.

References

External links
 KXO Radio

 

XO
Oldies radio stations in the United States
El Centro, California
Imperial County, California
Radio stations established in 1927
1927 establishments in California